Kim Ik-Hyun (born 30 April 1989) is a South Korean football midfielder. He is best known for his time with Busan I'Park.

Club career

Kim joined Busan I'Park in 2009 as a draft pick from Korea University.  Largely unused in his first four seasons with the club, Kim featured more regularly in the 2013 season, most commonly in a holding midfield role alongside Park Jong-Woo. He scored his first goal for the club on 28 August 2013 in a league match against Jeju United.

He was released by Busan in January 2015, but rejoined the team in July as they were eventually relegated to the K League 2. Kim joined Hwaseong FC in 2017 and later played for Gyeongju Citizen and Yangju Citizen.

Club career statistics

References

External links

1989 births
Living people
Association football midfielders
South Korean footballers
Busan IPark players
K League 1 players